The 2003–04 season was Sporting CP's 97th season in existence and 70th consecutive season in the top flight of Portuguese football. 

The club had a disappointing season in the wake of teenage starlet Cristiano Ronaldo's transfer to Manchester United and Mario Jardel's transfer to Bolton Wanderers in August 2003. In the league, they finished one point behind arch rivals Benfica, who clinched the final spot for the Champions League thanks to a late goal by Geovanni in the penultimate round of the season during the Lisbon derby. In the Portuguese Cup, the club was eliminated in the fifth round after entering in the fourth round. In the UEFA Cup, the club was eliminated at home in the second round with three goals in less than ten minutes by Turkish club Gençlerbirliği after having drawn the first leg.

Squad

Goalkeepers
  Ricardo
  Nélson
  Tiago

Defenders
  Facundo Quiroga
  Ânderson Polga
  Hugo
  Mário Sérgio
  Miguel Garcia
  Paíto
  Beto
  Luís Filipe
  Rui Jorge
  Santamaria
  Eduardo Maldea

Midfielders
  Rui Bento
  Carlos Martins
  Pedro Barbosa
  Rodrigo Tello
  Paulo Bento
  Fábio Rochemback
  Custódio
  Clayton
  Toñito
  Tinga

Attackers
  Marius Niculae
  Sá Pinto
  João Pinto
  Lourenço
  Elpídio Silva
  Liédson

Competitions

Primeira Liga

Standings

Matches

 Académica-Sporting 1-2
 1-0 Filipe Alvim 
 1-1 Lourenço 
 1-2 Beto 
 Sporting-Belenenses 4-2
 1-0 Fábio Rochemback 
 2-0 Toñito 
 2-1 Sousa 
 2-2 Leonardo 
 3-2 Lourenço 
 4-2 Toñito 
 Porto-Sporting 4-1
 1-0 Derlei 
 2-0 Edgaras Jankauskas 
 3-0 Maniche 
 3-1 Fábio Rochemback 
 4-1 Benni McCarthy 
 Sporting-Nacional 2-0
 1-0 Fábio Rochemback 
 2-0 Toñito 
 Moreirense-Sporting 1-0
 1-0 Manoel 
 Sporting-Gil Vicente 1-0
 1-0 Rodrigo Tello 
 Marítimo-Sporting 2-1
 0-1 Liédson 
 1-1 Marcelo Carioca 
 2-1 Alan 
 Sporting-Beira-Mar 3-1
 1-0 Liédson 
 1-1 Sandro 
 2-1 João Pinto 
 3-1 Liédson 
 Alverca-Sporting 1-2
 1-0 Torrão 
 1-1 Fábio Rochemback 
 1-2 Liédson 
 Sporting-Rio Ave 1-1
 0-1 Evandro 
 1-1 Silva 
 Paços de Ferreira-Sporting 1-2
 0-1 Pedro Barbosa 
 1-1 Zé Manuel 
 1-2 Pedro Barbosa 
 Sporting-Braga 2-0
 1-0 João Pinto 
 2-0 Silva 
 Estrela Amadora-Sporting 1-4
 0-1 Fábio Rochemback 
 1-1 Júlio César 
 1-2 Pedro Barbosa 
 1-3 Liédson 
 1-4 Liédson 
 Sporting-Boavista 1-0
 1-0 Silva 
 Benfica-Sporting 1-3
 0-1 Fábio Rochemback 
 0-2 Silva 
 1-2 Luisão 
 1-3 Sá Pinto 
 Sporting-Vitória Guimarães 2-1
 0-1 Romeu 
 1-1 João Pinto 
 2-1 Pedro Barbosa 
 Sporting-Académica 2-0
 1-0 Liédson 
 2-0 Pedro Barbosa 
 Belenenses-Sporting 1-3
 1-0 Marco Paulo 
 1-1 Sá Pinto 
 1-2 João Pinto 
 1-3 Liédson 
 Sporting-Porto 1-1
 0-1 Jorge Costa 
 1-1 Pedro Barbosa 
 Nacional-Sporting 3-3
 0-1 Sá Pinto 
 1-1 Gouveia 
 2-1 Adriano 
 2-2 Marius Niculae 
 2-3 Lourenço 
 3-3 Carlos Álvarez 
 Sporting-Moreirense 1-0
 1-0 Fábio Rochemback 
 Gil Vicente-Sporting 1-1
 1-0 Luís Loureiro 
 1-1 Carlos Martins 
 Sporting-Marítimo 1-0
 1-0 Beto 
 Beira-Mar-Sporting 0-2
 0-1 Pedro Barbosa 
 0-2 Fábio Rochemback 
 Sporting-Alverca 2-0
 1-0 Carlos Martins 
 2-0 Liédson 
 Rio Ave-Sporting 4-0
 1-0 Evandro 
 2-0 Jaime 
 3-0 Paulo César 
 4-0 Evandro 
 Sporting-Paços de Ferreira 1-0
 1-0 Liédson 
 Braga-Sporting 2-3
 0-1 Silva 
 0-2 Liédson 
 0-3 Pedro Barbosa 
 1-3 Henrique 
 2-3 Henrique 
 Sporting-Estrela Amadora 4-0
 1-0 Liédson 
 2-0 Liédson 
 3-0 Marius Niculae 
 4-0 Liédson 
 Boavista-Sporting 2-1
 0-1 Liédson 
 1-1 Frechaut 
 2-1 Fary Faye 
 União Leiria-Sporting 1-0
 1-0 Alhandra 
 Sporting-Benfica 0-1
 0-1 Geovanni 
 Vitória Guimarães-Sporting 0-2
 0-1 Marius Niculae 
 0-2 João Pinto

Taca de Portugal

Matches

Fourth Round

Fifth Round

UEFA Cup

Matches 
First Round

Second Round

Player Statistics

References 

Sporting CP seasons
Sporting